Oritrophium is a genus of Mesoamerican and South American flowering plant in the tribe Astereae within the family Asteraceae.

 Species

References

 
Asteraceae genera
Flora of South America
Taxonomy articles created by Polbot